In Greek mythology, Cassotis (Ancient Greek: Κασσοτίς or Κασσωτίς) was the naiad (a Pegaea) who lived in the spring at the Oracle at Delphi, dedicated to Apollo; the spring was named after her.

External links
ΠΑΥΣΑΝΙΟΥ ΕΛΛΑΔΟΣ ΠΕΡΙΗΓΗΣΙΣ: ΦΩΚΙΚΑ ΚΕʹ

Naiads